The Bombay Brasserie is an Indian restaurant in Kensington, London, opened in 1982. 
The name has also been used by a restaurant in Bradford.

It was listed in the Michelin Guide 2016 as being of "excellent standard". The London Economic stated the restaurant's mission as having always been to present "the authentic food of Bombay in all its ethnic variety", commenting that after refurbishment, it met and exceeded that goal. Cultural influences include Parsi, Goan, Bengali, and Gujarati. In 2016, Calibre Quarterly called it a "leading contender for London's finest Indian restaurant". Sloan Magazine described it as luxurious and iconic, with "authentic, eclectic Bombay and Indian cuisine."

See also
 English cuisine

References

External links 
 Website

1982 establishments in the United Kingdom
Indian restaurants in London
Restaurants established in 1982